Willard is a city in Greene County, Missouri, United States. As of the 2020 census, the city population was 6,344. It is part of the Springfield, Missouri Metropolitan Statistical Area.

History
The City of Willard was founded in 1884 and incorporated in 1949. Willard's main east–west road, U.S. 160, is known as Olympian Boulevard because two graduates of Willard High School have participated in the Olympics. Although the town remains relatively small in size, the city of Willard has undergone considerable growth in recent years and still continues to grow.

Geography
Willard is located at  (37.294429, -93.423218).

Demographics

2010 census
As of the census of 2010, there were 5,288 people, 1,901 households, and 1,455 families living in the city. The racial makeup of the city was 96.4% White, 0.9% African American, 0.6% Native American, 0.1% Asian, 0.1% Pacific Islander, 0.3% from other races, and 1.8% from two or more races. Hispanic or Latino of any race were 1.8% of the population.

There were 1,901 households, of which 45.9% had children under the age of 18 living with them, 59.8% were married couples living together, 11.9% had a female householder with no husband present, 4.8% had a male householder with no wife present, and 23.5% were non-families. 19.2% of all households were made up of individuals, and 7.3% had someone living alone who was 65 years of age or older. The average household size was 2.75 and the average family size was 3.13.

The median age in the city was 32.2 years. 30.7% of residents were under the age of 18; 8.1% were between the ages of 18 and 24; 31% were from 25 to 44; 19.9% were from 45 to 64; and 10.2% were 65 years of age or older. The gender makeup of the city was 48.4% male and 51.6% female.

2000 census
As of the census of 2000, there were 3,193 people, 1,154 households, and 909 families living in the city. The population density was 575.2 people per square mile (222.1/km). There were 1,226 housing units at an average density of 220.9 per square mile (85.3/km). The racial makeup of the city was 97.75% White, 0.16% African American, 0.66% Native American, 0.09% Asian, 0.22% from other races, and 1.13% from two or more races. Hispanic or Latino of any race were 0.53% of the population.

There were 1,154 households, out of which 45.7% had children under the age of 18 living with them, 64.8% were married couples living together, 11.3% had a female householder with no husband present, and 21.2% were non-families. 18.7% of all households were made up of individuals, and 9.8% had someone living alone who was 65 years of age or older. The average household size was 2.76 and the average family size was 3.14.

In the city the population was spread out, with 32.5% under the age of 18, 7.5% from 18 to 24, 33.0% from 25 to 44, 17.0% from 45 to 64, and 10.1% who were 65 years of age or older. The median age was 32 years. For every 100 females, there were 89.9 males. For every 100 females age 18 and over, there were 86.5 males.

The median income for a household in the city was $39,565, and the median income for a family was $43,646. Males had a median income of $29,420 versus $20,370 for females. The per capita income for the city was $15,253. About 9.3% of families and 9.6% of the population were below the poverty line, including 10.6% of those under age 18 and 12.6% of those age 65 or over.

Education
Willard's school system is a 4/5-A school containing five elementary schools, two intermediate schools, one middle school, and one high school and is in the Central Ozark Conference- Large division.

The fine arts programs at Willard are known as some of the best in the nation. Willard Music ed is named one of the nation's best in music education. Furthermore the Willard Naval Junior Reserve Officers' Training Corps unit has achieved national level success in more than ten national level drill, athletic, and academic competitions, most recently in April 2022, placing 26th out of 620 units in the nation. Athletically the Tigers have achieved success in nearly all sports. The Tigers baseball team won three consecutive district titles from 2012 to 2014, including state Final Four appearances in 2012 and 2013. The Tigers boys basketball team won district titles in 2013–2014, and has recent state Final four appearances in 2005 and 2007. Willard football enjoyed one of their best seasons on record in 2013 when they finished with an 8-3 overall record.

Willard East, Willard North, Willard South, Willard Central, and Willard Orchard Hills (built in 2011) make up the elementary schools. Willard Intermediate-North, Willard Intermediate-South (Built in 2019), Willard Middle, and Willard High make up the rest of the schools.

Notable people
John Ashcroft - Politician
Lori Endicott - Olympian - Volleyball (Bronze Medalist, 1992 Barcelona Olympics)
B.J. Flores - Professional Boxer
Tom Greenwade- Baseball scout
Forrest Merrill - Professional Football Player (Los Angeles Chargers)
Jason Pyrah - Olympian - Track & Field (1996 and 2000)
Chappell Roan - Singer/Songwriter

References

External links
 City of Willard
US Census American Factfinder for Willard, MO

Cities in Greene County, Missouri
Springfield metropolitan area, Missouri
Cities in Missouri